Leandra is a genus of plants in the family Melastomataceae.

Species include:
 Leandra pastazana Wurdack
 Leandra subseriata Cogn.

 
Melastomataceae genera
Taxonomy articles created by Polbot